Rhodora may refer to:

Rhododendrons 
 Rhododendron canadense, a deciduous flowering shrub in the subgenus Pentanthera
 Rhododendron sect. Rhodora, a discontinued section of subgenus Pentanthera

Other uses 
 The Rhodora, an 1834 poem by Ralph Waldo Emerson
 Rhodora (horse), a racehorse
 Rhodora (journal), a scholarly journal
 Rhodora Cadiao, Filipina politician